Allotalanta synclera is a moth in the family Cosmopterigidae. It was described by Edward Meyrick in 1921. It is found in India (Kanara).

The forewings are rather dark fuscous, darker and purplish-tinged towards the base. The hindwings are light grey, paler and thinly scaled towards the base and the veins darker. There is a small oval hyaline spot beneath the cell near the base.

References

Natural History Museum Lepidoptera generic names catalog

Moths described in 1921
Cosmopteriginae
Moths of Asia